Enix was a Japanese video game publishing company founded in September 1975 by Yasuhiro Fukushima. Initially a tabloid publisher named Eidansha Boshu Service Center, in 1982 it ventured into video game publishing for Japanese home computers such as the PC-8800 series, the X1 series, and the FM-7. Fukushima had no programming knowledge and did not employ internal programmers or game designers. Instead, he held a contest for programming hobbyists in order to pool talents and publish selected games, with a ¥1 million award for the top prize (US$5,000). Few entries were received in the first month, but after a marketing campaign on television and in appliance stores, hobby clubs, computer and manga magazines, three hundred entries were received by the end of the "First Game Hobby Program Contest".

This contest allowed Enix to release numerous games with a wide variety of genres early on, as thirteen winning entries were polished and chosen for release in February 1983. Among these were Morita no Battle Field by Kazurou Morita; Door Door by Koichi Nakamura; and Love Match Tennis by Yuji Horii, a young columnist for Weekly Shōnen Jump. In addition to two more contests, Enix began recruiting developers on a project basis. For each project, Enix outsourced development and handled production and promotion duties, which made cost control more efficient. Unlike software houses of the time, Fukushima tried to instill a commercial mindset in his developers, as he thought games should be treated as books or movies in terms of copyright. He employed a royalty payment system between the company and the developers so that the latter would be compensated proportionally to the direct sales of their games. Each of Enix's home computer release featured a photo and resume of the developer on the back cover of the package.

Enix's home computer games were commercially successful; on their release, the first batch of February 1983 ranked first, second, third, fifth and seventh in the top ten Japanese best-selling games, leading to other game releases and a profit of ¥300 million (US$1.5 million) by the end of the year. Enix moved into traditional game publishing in 1985, beginning by porting its most successful home computer games to the Famicom console: Door Door, which sold 200,000 copies, and The Portopia Serial Murder Case, which sold 700,000. Enix soon focused primarily on publishing titles for consoles, though it continued to sell home computer games through to 1993. With the exception of the character designer Akira Toriyama, the development team of Enix's future flagship series Dragon Quest was recruited, thanks to the company's programming contests: Horii and Nakamura had won the first contest, and Koichi Sugiyama was contacted after sending in a questionnaire postcard for Morita Kazurou no Shogi.

List by year

1983

1984

1985

1986

1987

1988

1989

1990

1991

1993

References 

Video game lists by company
Video game lists by platform
Video games developed in Japan